Thomas Gansch (born 31 December 1975 in St. Pölten) is a well-known Vienna-based Austrian trumpet player.

In 1992 the brass septet Mnozil Brass was founded in which he has since played first trumpet.
In 1999 he was invited to the Vienna Art Orchestra, a renowned European Big Band. 
Later he founded his own "little big band", Gansch & Roses.
Thomas Gansch performs on an unusual looking, self designed trumpet, commonly referred to as the "Gansch Horn," that resembles a standard jazz B trumpet but with a rotary valve system. The instrument is made by the Austrian manufacturer Schagerl. Gansch uses this with a Bach 3B megatone trumpet mouthpiece.

Family 
He grew up in a musical family:
 His father Johann Gansch was a renowned Austrian composer and pedagogue for brass music instruments. He was called the "marching king".
 His older brother Hans Gansch (born 1953) is a trumpet soloist and professor of trumpet studies at the Salzburg Mozarteum. He was principal trumpeter in the Vienna Philharmonic Orchestra from 1982–1996.

Thomas began his studies at Vienna music school at the age of 15.

References 

Austrian trumpeters
Male trumpeters
People from Sankt Pölten
1975 births
Living people
20th-century trumpeters
21st-century trumpeters
20th-century male musicians
21st-century male musicians
Vienna Art Orchestra members